Aori Qileng (ch: 傲日其楞, born June 25, 1993) is a Chinese mixed martial artist of Mongol ethnicity who competes in the Bantamweight division of the Ultimate Fighting Championship.

Background 
Growing up in Xilingol League, Inner Mongolia, his family were herders and lived a nomadic lifestyle. In Mongolian, Aori qileng means "universe". As a child, Aori relied on the excellent physical fitness to embark on the road of sports. After training with the coach for a period of time, he was sent to Xi'an Sports Institute to practice Sanda with the famous coach Zhao Xuejun. Under the influence of his senior brother, Ao Riqi Leng began to switch to free-fighting mixed martial arts.

He would win various championships in Sanda, winning the championship 2012 Inner Mongolia National Games at 52 kg, the championship of 2013 Inner Mongolia Sanshou Tournament at 56 kg, the championship of 2014 Fight King Tournament at 60 kg, the championship of 2015 Fight King Tournament at 63 kg in Inner Mongolia Tongliao, and finally in December 2016, he won the gold belt in Sino-French King of Fighters Match 61 kg four-way tournament, winning two consecutive matches to take the gold belt.

Mixed martial arts career

Early career
Aori Qileng compiled a 20–9 record mostly on the Chinese regional scene, most notably winning the WLF Bantamweight Championship and defending the title of China's top mixed martial arts promotion Wu Lin Feng.

Ultimate Fighting Championship
Aori faced Jeff Molina on April 24, 2021, at UFC 261. He lost the bout via unanimous decision. The bout earned Aori a Fight of the Night bonus award.

Aori faced Cody Durden on November 20, 2021, at UFC Fight Night: Vieira vs. Tate. He lost the bout via unanimous decision.

Aori faced Cameron Else on April 23, 2022, at UFC Fight Night: Lemos vs. Andrade. He won the fight via technical knockout in the first round.

Aori faced Jay Perrin on August 20, 2022, at UFC 278, winning an exciting contest by unanimous decision (29-28, 29–28, 29–28).

Championships and accomplishments
Ultimate Fighting Championship
Fight of the Night (One time) 
Wu Lin Feng
WLF Bantamweight Championship (One time)
One successful title defence

Mixed martial arts record

|-
|Win
|align=center|24–9
|Jay Perrin
|Decision (unanimous)
|UFC 278
|
|align=center|3
|align=center|5:00
|Salt Lake City, Utah, United States
|
|-
|Win
|align=center|23–9
|Cameron Else
|TKO (punches)
|UFC Fight Night: Lemos vs. Andrade
|
|align=center|1
|align=center|2:48
|Las Vegas, Nevada, United States
| 
|-
|Loss
|align=center|22–9
|Cody Durden
|Decision (unanimous)
|UFC Fight Night: Vieira vs. Tate
|
|align=center|3
|align=center|5:00
|Las Vegas, Nevada, United States
|
|-
|Loss
|align=center|22–8
|Jeff Molina
|Decision (unanimous)
|UFC 261
|
|align=center|3
|align=center|5:00
|Jacksonville, Florida, United States
|
|-
|Win
|align=center|23–7
|Khizri Abdulaev
|KO (punches)
|WLF W.A.R.S. 41
|
|align=center|2
|align=center|3:38
|Zhengzhou, China
|
|-
|Win
|align=center|22–7
|Amirlan Amirov
|Decision (unanimous)
|WLF W.A.R.S. 39
|
|align=center|3
|align=center|5:00
|Zhengzhou, China
|
|-
|Win
|align=center|21–7
|Giorgi Borashvili
|TKO (retirement)
|WLF W.A.R.S. 35
|
|align=center|1
|align=center|5:00
|Zhengzhou, China
|
|-
|Win
|align=center|20–7
|Yong E
|Submission (armbar)
|WLF W.A.R.S. 31
|
|align=center|1
|align=center|3:34
|Henan, China
|
|-
|Win
|align=center|19–7
|Carlos Eduardo de Azevedo
|Decision (unanimous)
|WLF W.A.R.S. 30
|
|align=center|3
|align=center|5:00
|Henan, China
|
|-
|Win
|align=center|18–7
|Orazgeldi Atabayev
|TKO (punches)
|WLF W.A.R.S. 29
|
|align=center|1
|align=center|4:40
|Zhengzhou, China
|
|-
|Loss
|align=center|17–7
|Amirlan Amirov
|Decision (unanimous)
|WLF W.A.R.S. 27
|
|align=center|3
|align=center|5:00
|Zhengzhou, China
|
|-
|Loss
|align=center|17–6
|Shuo Wang
| Decision (unanimous)
|Chin Woo Men: 2017-2018 Season: Stage 10
|
|align=center|3
|align=center|5:00
|Guangzhou, China
| 
|-
|Win
|align=center|17–5
|Sen Yang
|Decision (unanimous)
|Chin Woo Men: 2017-2018 Season: Stage 9
|
|align=center|3
|align=center|5:00
|Guangzhou, China
| 
|-
|Loss
|align=center|16–5
|Jiaerken Ailimubai
|Decision (unanimous)
|Chin Woo Men: 2017-2018 Season: Stage 7
|
|align=center|3
|align=center|5:00
|Guangzhou, China
| 
|-
|Win
|align=center|15–4
|Vladislav Doroshenko
|Decision (unanimous)
|WLF W.A.R.S. 22
|
|align=center| 3
|align=center| 5:00
|Kaifeng, China
| 
|-
|Loss
|align=center|14–4
|Xiaolong Wu
|Decision (split)
|Chin Woo Men: 2017-2018 Season: Stage 6
|
|align=center| 3
|align=center| 5:00
|Guangzhou, China
| 
|-
|Win
|align=center|14–3
|Maksadjon Yusupov
|Decision (unanimous)
|WLF W.A.R.S. 21
|
|align=center| 3
|align=center| 5:00
|Zhengzhou, China
|
|-
|Win
|align=center|13–3
|Ailiyaer Didaer
|Decision (unanimous)
|Chin Woo Men: 2017-2018 Season, Stage 1
|
|align=center| 3
|align=center| 5:00
|Wuhan, China
|
|-
|Win
|align=center|12–3
|Kana Hyatt
|TKO (punches)
|WLF W.A.R.S. 19
|
|align=center|1
|align=center|3:24
|Zhengzhou, China
|
|-
|Win
|align=center|11–3
|Huo You Ga Bu
|Decision (split)
|WLF W.A.R.S. 17
|
|align=center|3
|align=center|5:00
|Zhengzhou, China
|
|-
|Win
|align=center|10–3
|Nakouzi
|TKO (punches)
|Guan Sheng International Wushu Culture Festival
|
|align=center|1
|align=center|2:29
|Yuncheng, China
|
|-
|Win
|align=center|9–3
|Vitalii
|TKO (flying knee and punches)
|Fight King Gold Belt Contest
|
|align=center|1
|align=center|1:44
|Xi'an, China
|
|-
|Loss
|align=center|8–3
|Umidjon Musayev
|Submission (rear-naked choke)
|WLF W.A.R.S. 15
|
|align=center|3
|align=center|1:01
|Zhengzhou, China
|
|-
|Loss
|align=center|8–2
|Kai Kara-France
|Decision (unanimous)
|WLF W.A.R.S. 14
|
|align=center|3
|align=center|5:00
|Zhengzhou, China
|
|-

|Win
|align=center|8–1
|Kirill Tropinin
|Decision (unanimous)
|W.A.R.S. 12
|
|align=center|3
|align=center|5:00
|Ningxiang, China
|
|-
|Win
|align=center|7–1
|Max Hunter Leali
|Decision (unanimous)
|Kung Fu World Cup 2017: Day 1
|
|align=center|3
|align=center|5:00
|Ningxiang, China
|
|-
|Win
|align=center|6–1
|Martial Seguy
|Decision (unanimous)
|rowspan=2|100% Fight: Contenders 34
|rowspan=2|
|align=center|3
|align=center|5:00
|rowspan=2|Aubervilliers, France
|
|-
|Win
|align=center|5–1
|Willy Zancanaro
|Decision (unanimous)
|align=center|2
|align=center|5:00
|
|-
|Win
|align=center|4–1
|Ahmad Davlatov
| TKO (punches)
|WLF E.P.I.C. 9
|
|align=center| 1
|align=center| 1:29
|Zhengzhou, China
|
|-
|Win
|align=center|3–1
|Rishat Kharisov
|Decision (unanimous)
|WLF E.P.I.C. 8
|
|align=center|3
|align=center|5:00
|Zhengzhou, China
| 
|-
|Loss
|align=center|2–1
|Grigorii Popov
|Submission (rear-naked choke)
|WLF E.P.I.C. 2
|
|align=center| 2
|align=center| 4:35
|Zhengzhou, China
|
|-
|Win
|align=center| 2–0
|Minghui Bai
|Decision (unanimous)
|CKF 4: Day 2
|
|align=center| 3
|align=center| 5:00
|Beijing, China
|
|-
|Win
|align=center| 1–0
|Guoqing Zhong
|Decision (unanimous)
|CKF 3
|
|align=center| 3
|align=center| 5:00
|Xi'an, China
|

See also 
 List of current UFC fighters
 List of male mixed martial artists

References

External links 
  
 

1993 births
Living people
Chinese male mixed martial artists
Flyweight mixed martial artists
Mixed martial artists utilizing sanshou
Ultimate Fighting Championship male fighters
Chinese sanshou practitioners
Chinese people of Mongolian descent